Chloropyron maritimum is a rare species of flowering plant in the family Orobanchaceae known by the common names salt marsh bird's beak and Point Reyes bird's beak, depending on the specific subspecies.  It was formerly classified as Cordylanthus maritimus.

Distribution and habitat
It is native to the Southwestern United States and northern Baja California. This is a halophyte which grows in areas of high salt concentrations, including coastal salt marshes and the inland salt flats of the Great Basin. It is hemiparasitic, such that it is greenish and has chlorophyll but also parasitizes other plants by inserting haustoria into their roots to tap nutrients.

Description
This plant grows in low clumps and has small, thick, gray-green hairy leaves often tinted with purple. It concentrates and excretes salts, giving its foliage a grainy crust. It erects an inflorescence several centimeters high which has many fuzz-covered white or cream club-shaped flowers with yellow or purplish tips. The fruit is a capsule containing many brown net-textured (reticulate) seeds.

Endangered species
Two subspecies of this plant are considered endangered. Cordylanthus maritimus ssp. maritimus is listed as endangered by the State of California and the United States Government. Cordylanthus maritimus ssp. palustre (Point Reyes bird's beak) is included in the California Native Plant Society Inventory of Rare and Endangered Plants of California.

References

External links
Jepson Manual Treatment
USDA Plants Profile
Photo gallery

Orobanchaceae
Halophytes
Flora of California
Flora of Baja California
Flora of the Great Basin
Flora of the Southwestern United States
Flora without expected TNC conservation status